Chief Festus Okotie-Eboh (18 July 1912 – 15 January 1966) was a Nigerian politician and Minister of Finance during the administration of Sir Abubakar Tafawa Balewa. Okotie-Eboh was born to an Itsekiri Chief, Prince Okotie Eboh in Warri Division, a town along the Benin River in Niger Delta. Before his change of name, he was Chief Festus Samuel Edah. He was a National Treasurer of the Nigerian First Republic party, NCNC, he was also a leader of the Federal Parliamentary Party of NCNC, replacing K.O. Mbadiwe.

Early life and business career
Okotie Eboh was born Festus Samuel Edah in Benin River, old Warri division. From 1932 to 1936, he attended Sapele Baptist School. Upon graduation, he clerked briefly in the Local District Office before returning to his alma mater as a teacher. In 1937, he gained employment at Bata Shoe Company as an accounting clerk. While working as a clerk, he was also studying bookkeeping and accounting. In 1944, Bata transferred him to Lagos as a Chief Clerk and West Coast Accountant. He was in Lagos for a year before returning to Sapele to become Deputy Manager of the Sapele branch. In 1947, he was sent to Prague, Czechoslovakia for further training where he obtained a diploma in business administration and chiropody. He left Bata Shoe to establish a timber and rubber business. He was involved in a rubber exporting business trading under the company name of Afro-Nigerian Export and Import Company. The firm exported ribbed smoked sheet rubber to Europe and North America. In 1958, he opened a rubber-creping factory and later in 1963, he started Omimi Rubber and Canvas Shoe factory. He also started a few ventures with two foreign partners: Dizengoff and Coutinho Caro, the partners promoted Mid-West Cement Co, a cement clinker plant in Koko and Unameji Cabinet Works.

Okotie Eboh got married in 1942 and together with his wife, started a string of schools in Sapele. The first school was Sapele Boys Academy,  followed with Zik's College of Commerce. In 1953, he started Sapele Academy Secondary School. In the 1940s and 1950s, Okotie Eboh was a board member of Warri Ports Advisory Committee, Sapele Township Advisory Board and Sapele Town Planning Authority.

Political career
In 1951, after some influence from Azikiwe, he contested for a seat and was elected to the Western Region House of Assembly. In 1954, he was elected treasurer of the N.C.N.C. and was successful as the party's candidate to represent Warri division in the House of Representatives. He was nominated as the Federal Minister of Labour and Welfare in January, 1955, and two years later, he was made Finance Minister.

Personal life
Okotie Eboh married an Itsekiri woman named Victoria in 1942. Their daughter, Alero, married Oladipo Jadesimi. Their youngest daughter was Ajoritsedere Awosika, a former civil servant.

Death
Okotie-Eboh was assassinated along with Prime Minister Tafawa Balewa in the military coup of January 15, 1966, which terminated the Nigerian First Republic, and thus civilian rule.

Further reading
Rosalynde Ainslie, Catherine Hoskyns, Ronald Segal; Frederick A. Praeger, Political Africa: A Who's Who of Personalities and Parties.  Frederick A. Praeger, 1961
Ryszard Kapuściński, Anatomy of a Coup d'Etat chapter in The Shadow of the Sun (1998)

References

1912 births
1966 deaths
Itsekiri people
Assassinated Nigerian politicians
Assassinated Nigerian people
Deaths by firearm in Nigeria
People murdered in Nigeria
Finance ministers of Nigeria
Delta State politicians
1966 murders in Nigeria